The  was the second Japanese professional wrestling memorial show and pay-per-view event promoted by Kyoko Kimura to commemorate the two-year anniversary of the death of her daughter Hana Kimura, who committed suicide on May 23, 2020. The event took place on May 23, 2022 at Korakuen Hall in Tokyo, Japan with a limited attendance due to the COVID-19 pandemic. The event was broadcast live by FITE TV.

Background
On May 23, 2020, Hana Kimura committed suicide at age 22.
Early that morning, Kimura posted self-harm images on Twitter and Instagram while sharing some of the hateful comments she received. In late 2020 and early 2021, the Tokyo Metropolitan Police arrested and charged multiple men for the cyberbullying that contributed to Hana's death.

In January 2022, it was reported that the second memorial show will materialize on further notice. The event was later scheduled for May 23, on the same date as the previous event from 2021. On May 14, 2022, Yu Ishino reached out via YouTube to announce that he will work as an ambassador at the event.

Event
The show featured former fellow wrestlers of Hana Kimura from World Wonder Ring Stardom such as the then-time World of Stardom Champion and God's Eye leader Syuri and former Tokyo Cyber Squad stablemate Jungle Kyona and Oedo Tai wrestler Rina who was accompanied ringside by Starlight Kid. Kairi, Shota and Ken Suzuki joined the commentary table for the night.

After winning the tag team battle royal, Chihiro Hashimoto and Mika Iwata were handed merchandise portraiting Hana Kimura by Ram Kaicho who won the 2021 battle royal. The show portraited the in-ring return of Jungle Kyona who was sidelined by injury for one and a half year who collided with Kyoko Kimura who came out of retirement for one more match in the honor of her daughter. The main event saw Syuri picking a win over Asuka. In the final moments of the show, a tribute video for Hana Kimura was aired, with various wrestlers such as Meiko Satomura, Kenny Omega, Riho, Nagisa Nozaki, Tajiri and many others paid tribute for Hana, reciting the word "Bagus" (great).

Sakura Hirota reprised her role of the previous 2021 show by dressing up as Hana Kimura in her red and black Oedo Tai ring gear during her series of matches.

Results

Notes

References

2022 in professional wrestling
2022 in Tokyo
Professional wrestling memorial shows
Women's professional wrestling shows
Events in Tokyo
Professional wrestling in Tokyo
Events affected by the COVID-19 pandemic